There are many busts of Italian patriots of the Risorgimento, and foreigners who fought with weapons or words for the unification of Italy, on the Janiculum in Rome.

Overview
The Roman Republic commissioned marble busts to be displayed in the gardens of the Pincian Hill on May 28, 1849, for 10,000 lire. By the end of the war, the 52 busts had been made, but because of the temporary power of the Pope they remained in warehouses on Capitoline Hill.

In June 1851, Pius IX ordered the arrangement of most of the fifty-two busts in the gardens of the Pincian Hill. He excluded some busts because they were atheists.
In 1860 the sculptors Achille Stocchi and Titus Sarrocchi were commissioned to create new busts. Their busts made a total of 228.

The initial placement of the statues took place between the end of 19th and early 20th centuries; the equestrian monument dedicated to Giuseppe Garibaldi was placed in 1896.  In the 1920s, during the Fascist regime, the war memorial on the Janiculum was built for the Roman cause. It preserves the remains of some patriots.

The first restoration of the statues was done in the 1960s. Later more restorations were completed for the Great Jubilee, during which a Roman villa was discovered, and new statues were restored and relocated, including those of Anita Garibaldi, Giuseppe Garibaldi, and their children.

Current monuments 

The crest of the Janiculum is dominated by the 1895 equestrian Monument to Garibaldi, designed by Italian sculptor Emilio Gallori.  This site was chosen for its proximity to the Villa Doria Pamphili, where Garibaldi mounted a military defense of the short-lived Roman Republic in late April 1849.

The hill also features a number of busts of historically significant Italians.  All the busts were restored during 2010 and 2011, coinciding with the 150th anniversary of Italy.  A 2011 guide published by the local Associazione Amilcare Cipriani group lists a total of 84 busts on the hill, 30 of them along the promenade north of the Garbaldi monument, and the rest to the south.  The busts have been prone to vandalism.

Statues on the Janiculum

Following is a partial list.

References

External links

Tourist attractions in Rome
Monuments and memorials in Rome